Chhu (Brahmi script:  Chhu) seems to have been a late Kushan Empire ruler, who ruled from 310 to 325 CE. His coinage is very similar to that of his near-contemporary Vasudeva. His rule corresponds to the last days of the Kushan Empire, before the conquest by Kidara.

The rule of Chhu was probably centered on the Punjab and neighbouring areas.

References

Kushan Empire